Fritz Karl Feldmann (15 December 1915 – 28 August 2002) was a Swiss rower. He competed at the 1936 Summer Olympics in Berlin with the men's eight where they came sixth.

References

1915 births
2002 deaths
Swiss male rowers
Olympic rowers of Switzerland
Rowers at the 1936 Summer Olympics
People from Winterthur
Sportspeople from the canton of Zürich